Nusrat Jahan Ruhi (born 8 January 1990) is an Indian actress who predominantly works in Bengali cinema. In 2019, Jahan became actively involved in politics and was elected as Member of Parliament, Lok Sabha from Basirhat constituency as a Trinamool Congress candidate. Jahan's screen debut was in Raj Chakraborty's Shotru.

Early life and education
Jahan was born into a Uttar Pradesh Muslim family in Calcutta (now Kolkata), West Bengal, India to Muhammed Shah Jahan and Sushma Khatun on 8 January 1990. She completed her schooling from Our Lady Queen of the Missions School, Kolkata and then went to college in Bhawanipur College, Kolkata graduating with a Bachelor of Commerce (Honours) degree.

Acting career
Jahan started her modelling career after winning the beauty contest, "Fair One Miss Kolkata" in 2010.

She made her Tollywood debut in the 2011 film, Shotru alongside Jeet. After a year's hiatus, she starred in her second film, Khoka 420 (2013), with Dev. The same year she appeared in Khiladi, opposite Ankush Hazra. She appeared in two item songs, "Chicken Tandoori" from Action and "Desi Chhori" from Yoddha - The Warrior, both of which were hits and became chartbusters. Jahan then appeared in Sondhey Namaar Aagey, with Rahul Bose, Rituparna Sengupta and Payel Sarkar.

In 2015, she featured in the comedy film, Jamai 420, opposite Ankush Hazra, with an ensemble cast including Payel Sarkar, Mimi Chakraborty, Soham Chakraborty and Hiran Chatterjee. Jahan was also a part of the theme song of BCL (Bengal Celebrity League) for the team "Midnapoor Mighities", with Dev and Sayantika Banerjee. Her next and last film of 2015 was Har Har Byomkesh, with Abir Chatterjee, Sohini Sarkar and Rachel White released in December 2015. The movie was a huge box office success.

In 2016, she appeared in director Rajiv Kumar Biswas' film Power, with Jeet and Sayantika Banerjee. That same year, she starred in the comedy film Kelor Kirti, with Dev, Jisshu Sengupta, Ankush Hazra, Mimi Chakraborty, Koushani Mukherjee and Sayantika Banerjee. Later that year, she was seen in Love Express, opposite Dev and after that in Zulfiqar, directed by Srijit Mukherji with a cast including Prosenjit Chatterjee, Kaushik Sen, Parambrata Chatterjee, Dev, Ankush Hazra, Jisshu Sengupta, and Paoli Dam.  Zulfiqar was among the top earning films of 2016. She ended 2016 with the comedy film Haripada Bandwala, with Ankush Hazra under the direction of Pathikrit Basu.

She was first seen in 2017, in One, with Prosenjit Chatterjee and Yash Dasgupta, directed by Birsa Dasgupta. In May 2017, her next film Ami Je Ke Tomar, with Ankush Hazra and Sayantika Banerjee was released. On 22 September 2017, Bolo Dugga Maiki, along with Ankush Hazra was released.

Jahan took a guest role in the 2018 film Uma followed by a role in Crisscross, directed by Birsa Dasgupta, and featuring Mimi Chakraborty, Priyanka Sarkar, Sohini Sarkar and Jaya Ahsan. After that, Rajiv Kumar Biswas selected her for the film Naqaab with Shakib Khan and Sayantika Banerjee. She danced in the song Joy Joy Durga Maa composed and featured by Jeet Gannguli, cricketer Sourav Ganguly, actress Subhashree Ganguly, Mimi Chakraborty and actor Bonny Sengupta were shown in the screen. This was released on the behalf of Captain TMT Bar as a promotion.

In 2020, she appeared in Asur, with Jeet and Abir Chatterjee and then in an action film on hostage rescue operation SOS Kolkata as ATS technical head Amanda Jones along with Yash Dasgupta, Mimi Chakraborty, Ena Saha and Shantilal Mukherjee.

Political career
On 12 March 2019, the Chief Minister of West Bengal and president of Trinamool Congress party, Mamata Banerjee announced that Jahan would contest the upcoming general election of 2019 from Basirhat Lok Sabha Constituency. She emerged as the winner by a margin of  votes against BJP candidate Sayantan Basu.

Personal life
Jahan and businessman Nikhil Jain had an elaborate marriage ceremony on 19 June 2019 in Turkey, followed by a reception attended by Chief Minister Mamata Banerjee and her actress friend and co-Member of Parliament Mimi Chakraborty, among other celebrities.

Jahan later has claimed that the marriage was not legal and "it was nothing more than a live-in relationship". Later a Kolkata court ruled that Jahan and Jain's marriage is legally invalid.

Jahan began her relationship with actor Yash Dasgupta but their marital status remains unknown as of December 2021. In August 2021, Jahan gave birth to a boy, at a private hospital in Kolkata. It is reported that the child's birth certificate named Dasgupta as the father.

Filmography

Mahalaya

Music videos

Awards
 In 2021 Nusrat honoured with "The Youth Icon" award at the 16th Tumi Ananya Awards
 In 2022 Nusrat was awarded Mahanayika by the chief minister of West Bengal Mamata Banerjee.

Notes

References

External links

 
 

1990 births
Living people
Actresses from Kolkata
West Bengal politicians
Lok Sabha members from West Bengal
Trinamool Congress politicians from West Bengal
Women in West Bengal politics
Women members of the Lok Sabha
Indian film actresses
Bengali actresses
Actresses in Bengali cinema
Indian television actresses
Bhawanipur Education Society College alumni
India MPs 2019–present
Indian actor-politicians
21st-century Indian actresses
21st-century Indian politicians
21st-century Indian women politicians